Shane Hodges (born 3 January 1975) is a former Australian rules footballer who played with the Brisbane Bears in the Australian Football League (AFL).

Hodges was chosen by Brisbane with the 21st pick of the 1993 AFL draft, from SANFL club North Adelaide.

He didn't play AFL in 1994 and made his first league appearance in round 11 of the 1995 season, a win over Fitzroy at the Gabba. Hodges played just three further games for the Bears.

References

External links
 
 

1975 births
Australian rules footballers from South Australia
Brisbane Bears players
North Adelaide Football Club players
Living people